Tonmawr is a village in Neath Port Talbot county borough, south Wales. It is part of the community of Pelenna and is located around four miles east of Neath.

The village is home to a rugby union team (Tonmawr RFC), a community centre, and the Bryn Bettws Lodge.

References

Villages in Neath Port Talbot